John Edward Hilliard (born April 16, 1976) is a former American football defensive end who played three seasons with the Seattle Seahawks of the National Football League (NFL). He was drafted by the Seahawks in the sixth round of the 2000 NFL Draft. Hilliard played college football at Mississippi State University and attended Sterling High School in Houston, Texas. He was also a member of the Green Bay Packers, New Orleans VooDoo and Grand Rapids Rampage.

Professional career

Seattle Seahawks
Hilliard was drafted by the Seattle Seahawks with the 190th pick in the 2000 NFL Draft. He was released by the Seahawks on August 25, 2003.

Green Bay Packers
Hilliard signed with the Green Bay Packers on January 19, 2004. He was released by the Packers on February 27, 2004.

New Orleans VooDoo
Hilliard was signed by the New Orleans VooDoo on October 28, 2004.

Grand Rapids Rampage
Hilliard was traded to the Grand Rapids Rampage on March 29, 2005.

References

External links
Just Sports Stats

Living people
1976 births
Players of American football from Louisiana
American football defensive ends
African-American players of American football
Mississippi State Bulldogs football players
Seattle Seahawks players
New Orleans VooDoo players
People from Coushatta, Louisiana
21st-century African-American sportspeople
20th-century African-American sportspeople